Eupterote kalliesi is a moth of the family Eupterotidae. It is found in Sumatra in an altitudinal range of 2100-2600m.

The length of its forewings is 35mm, the antennae 12 mm long, blackish and bipectinated.

Etymology
The species was named after its collector A. Kallies.

References
Nässig,2000. A new and remarkable species of Eupterote from the mountains of West Sumatra (Lepidoptera: Eupterotidae). Heterocera Sumatrana Vol.12, fasc. 2. p.67-77

Moths of Sumatra
Eupterotinae
Moths described in 2000